A constitutional referendum was held in Uruguay on 26 November 1989 alongside general elections. The proposed changes to the constitution would require state pensions to be increased at the same rate as the salary of civil servants. The proposal was approved by 81.78% of those voting and 72.51% of all registered voters.

Background
Uruguay was suffering from a high inflation rate of around 100% at the time of the referendum. It was held after a petition was submitted by pensioner organisations with the required signatures of 10% of the number of registered voters.  In order to pass, the referendum had to be approved by a 50% of those voting and 35% of registered voters. Invalid or blank votes were taken to be "no" votes.

Constitutional amendments
The proposals would amend article 67 of the constitution to state:

Results

Aftermath
The effect of the amendment was a rapid rise in pension expenditure, which increased government spending by around 2–3% of GDP.

References

1989 referendums
1989 in Uruguay
Referendums in Uruguay
Welfare in Uruguay
Pension referendums
Constitutional referendums in Uruguay
November 1989 events in South America
Julio María Sanguinetti